Bent But Not Broken is a 2019 memoir by Don Cummings published by Heliotrope Books. The book recounts the discovery and treatment of Peyronie's disease and the emotional and relationship trauma leading to the recovery and healing of the sexual self and how disease and hardship has the ability to psychologically and spiritually force issues of transformation and acceptance.

Reception
Kirkus Reviews wrote, "Cummings’ skills as a writer are apparent from the beginning. His prose is effortlessly clever, finding the entertaining medium between lyricism and sass. The frankness with which he discusses his problem, the treatment, and his sex life makes for an oddly shocking book—one rarely reads quite so much about penises, as central as they often are to literature. He manages to demystify and destigmatize Peyronie's, which though obscure is not completely uncommon. More than that, he makes the most of an undignified opportunity to examine his own masculinity."

See also
 Creative nonfiction
 Memoirs

References

External links
 The New York Times Personal Health by Jane E. Brody
 Don Cummings Official Site
 Advocate by Diane Anderson-Minshall
 New York Journal of Books by Heidi Mastrogiovanni

2019 non-fiction books
American autobiographies
American memoirs
Books with cover art by Chip Kidd